Lucia Siposová (born 21 May 1980) is a Slovak stage, television and film actress.

Career 
Together with Karel Roden she played the lead role in a Czech period drama Guard No. 47 directed by Filip Renč for which she received the Best actress award 2008 at the International film festival in Tiburon, USA.
She got a role in the international feature film 360 directed by Oscar nominee Fernando Meirelles and written by Oscar nominee Peter Morgan. 360 gave Lucia recognition in international media.

She is an author of a book “Hello. My name is Anča Pagáčová.“ 
She continued as a writer with the screenplay for the motion picture Tigers in the city directed by Juraj Krasnohorsky that she also co-produced.
Member of Slovak PEN centre.

Recently, she appeared at the stage in Slovak/Slovenian reality cabaret show Slovenka na kvadrat (She two times) written by Stanislava Repar Chrobáková and directed by Nick Upper (Nico Goršič).

References

External links 
 
 
 Tigers in the city homepage
 
 She two times at Festival Ex Ponto

1980 births
Living people
Slovak film actresses
21st-century Slovak women singers
Slovak stage actresses
Slovak television actresses
Slovak women writers
21st-century Slovak actresses
Slovak screenwriters
Film people from Bratislava

Masked Singer winners